During the 2008–09 season, Queens Park Rangers played in the Football League Championship, their fifth consecutive season at this level.

Pre-season

New managerial team
Ian Dowie was announced as the replacement for Luigi De Canio as manager on 14 May 2008. Tim Flowers was later named Dowie's assistant, reprising his former role with Dowie at Coventry City. Paulo Sousa was named as manager after Ian Dowie was fired. When Sousa was fired, Gareth Ainsworth became caretaker manager.

Sponsorship
Following the termination of the club's sponsorship deals with Car Giant, Le Coq Sportif and Sellotape at the end of the previous season, in July it was announced that Gulf Air would be the new shirt sponsors. Further sponsorship packages were also announced, including Abbey Financial Services, Chronotech and Lotto Sport Italia.

Matches
All but one of QPR's pre-season fixtures were held away from Loftus Road while the ground underwent upgrading work ahead of the new season. Despite the optimism surrounding the club on the back of the investment and player transfers, Rangers suffered defeats in 3 out of 5 of their warm-up fixtures. The club started positively, winning 3–1 against Conference National side Stevenage Borough followed by a 1–0 win over Football League One side Northampton Town. However a pre-season tour to Scotland saw Rangers lose 2–0 and 1–0 (respectively) to Scottish Premier League sides Falkirk and Kilmarnock. The pre-season fixtures culminated in a 2–1 defeat at the hands of Serie A side Chievo in front of just 3,540 at Loftus Road.

Events
Queens Park Rangers started the season against Barnsley at Loftus Road. Fitz Hall scored twice in as many minutes after Iain Hume put the Yorkshire side 1–0 up in the fifth minute. Hall also missed a penalty in the second half, but Rangers held on to win the game 2–1. A win at Swindon Town in the League Cup followed before the first defeat of the season, to Sheffield United, 3–0 at Bramall Lane. Comprehensive home wins against Doncaster Rovers, Carlisle United (in the League Cup) and Southampton followed, before a win away against Norwich City saw Rangers put together a five-game unbeaten streak.

A defeat at Coventry City was followed by a 1–0 win at Aston Villa in the third round of the League Cup with Damion Stewart getting the decisive goal. The result meant that QPR entered the fourth round of the competition for the first time since the 1995–96 season, where they were drawn away to reigning Premier League champions Manchester United. The euphoria of the Villa result was short-lived and Rangers returned to losing ways at home to Derby County just three days later. By early October, QPR had slipped to 11th in the Championship, following defeat to league leaders Birmingham City at St Andrew's. Former manager Terry Venables was speculatively linked with a return to Loftus Road to replace Iain Dowie if no improvement was seen in the club's form. Meanwhile, Dexter Blackstock stood out as an early contender for the club's top scorer for the season with 5 goals in 13 matches in all competitions.

On 23 October, reports in the British press announced that the club would cap the maximum ticket price at the Category "C" (£35) level as a response to the worsening financial crisis of 2007–2008. This led commentators to speculate that the club was damaged by negative press surrounding earlier proposed ticket price increases. The following day, Iain Dowie was sacked after just fifteen games in charge of the club. While the press continued to speculate on Dowie's replacement, touting Roberto Mancini and Kenny Jackett among several others as potential candidates, existing player/coach Gareth Ainsworth was appointed caretaker manager in the interim. In his first game in charge Rangers ended Reading's 100% record at the Madejski Stadium, grinding out a 0–0 draw.

Just over three weeks after their defeat at St Andrew's, Rangers played Birmingham again in a mid-week fixture at Loftus Road. In Ainsworth's second match in charge, a ten-man Rangers side won 1–0 courtesy of a 25-yard goal from Samuel Di Carmine. At the start of November, Rangers lost 2–0 to Ipswich Town beating Cardiff 1–0 at Loftus Road one week later. The mid-week League Cup tie at Old Trafford saw QPR defeated 1–0 missing out on the last eight of the competition courtesy of a Carlos Tevez penalty. The woes continued four days later with only the club's second home defeat of the season, this time at the hands of Burnley. By mid-November, the side's average of less than one goal-per-match led to them being ranked 21st in terms of the attacking statistics of the 24 Championship clubs, despite sitting tenth in the league table.

On 19 November, Paulo Sousa, a former Portugal midfielder and previously assistant coach of the Portugal national team, was announced as the first team coach, ending Ainsworth's six-match run as caretaker. The following day, Tim Flowers stepped down as assistant coach and news sources (including the club's official website) reported Rangers had signed Bolton striker Heiðar Helguson on an emergency loan deal. Signed to a -year contract, Sousa became the sixth first team coach of the club in 13 months. Just three days into his appointment, Sousa's first match in charge saw a ten-man QPR comprehensively beaten 3–0 away at Watford, leaving them firmly in mid-table, nine points above the relegation zone and three points from the play-offs. Purported new signing Helguson did not appear for the club at Vicarage Road, with rumours later surfacing the deal had not been completed. A mid-week fixture against struggling Charlton Athletic saw Sousa's first victory (2–1), with Dexter Blackstock (who returned from suspension) scoring twice. Four days later, Rangers travelled across London to Selhurst Park, drawing 0–0 with Crystal Palace, a match which featured Premier League striker Heiðar Helguson, who had completed his loan move from Bolton Wanderers earlier in the week.

QPR played league-leaders Wolverhampton Wanderers in the first match of December. Played in a late kick-off at Loftus Road and in front of the Sky Sports cameras, QPR put on a fine performance, despatching their high-flying opponents with a 1–0 win courtesy of a 20-yard effort from skipper Martin Rowlands in his first full appearance since returning from injury. Despite dominating their next match, away to Sheffield Wednesday, QPR were beaten 1–0. The game marked QPR's 6th defeat from 11 away fixtures, and in which they had only scored twice. One week later, QPR scored their first goal in nine "away" fixtures, managing a 1–1 draw with Plymouth Argyle. Heiðar Helguson put QPR into an early lead before Plymouth equalised late in the second half. On 20 December, Helguson was again on the scoresheet, scoring twice alongside Dexter Blackstock's winner in Rangers' 3–2 victory over Preston North End.

The Christmas period saw QPR draw 2–2, twice surrendering the lead, away from home at Charlton Athletic on Boxing Day. Two days later, QPR played host to Watford, holding them to a 0–0 draw. As the January transfer window opened, QPR signed former England U21 international Wayne Routledge from Aston Villa. The club also made recent loan signings Borrowdale and Helguson's moves permanent. A small crowd of under 9,000 spectators saw Rangers start their FA Cup campaign with a goalless draw with fellow Championship side Burnley, in the third round. Returning to action in the Championship, QPR drew at home to Coventry City on 10 January with Dexter Blackstock again on the scoresheet. The result left QPR in ninth place in the league table for the sixth consecutive match, five points outside of the promotion play-off places and 13 points above the relegation zone. In the same week, Rangers also secured a permanent return to the club for Lee Cook and released veteran Italian midfielder Damiano Tommasi. Travelling to Turf Moor for the FA Cup third round replay, QPR lost 2–1 after Burnley scored from a defensive error in the last minute of extra time. Samuel Di Carmine put Rangers ahead in the 54th minute with Burnley equalising just six minutes later before their last-gasp winner. Martin Rowlands also hit the woodwork and Helguson had a goal disallowed in an eventful match played in front of just 3,760 spectators.

On 17 January, QPR achieved their first away victory in all competitions since September. They defeated Derby County 2–0 at Pride Park Stadium, with new signing Wayne Routledge opening the scoring. Ten days later, Rangers travelled to Bloomfield Road and defeated Blackpool 3–0, with Heiðar Helguson scoring twice. During the same month, QPR terminated former captain Adam Bolder's contract and loaned Zesh Rehman out to Bradford City. On 31 January, QPR extended their unbeaten run to eight matches with a scoreless draw at home to second-placed Reading. The result left Rangers in seventh place with 15 matches remaining, two points outside of the playoff positions and 16 points above the relegation zone.

The next scheduled match, a home fixture against Swansea City, was postponed due to heavy snowfalls in central London. However, QPR continued their unbeaten run into February beginning with a 2–2 draw away to Nottingham Forest. In an entertaining match, Matteo Alberti scored his first goals for the club within the space of three minutes after half-time. On 17 February, the club announced the signing of Spanish midfielder Jordi López on a three-month contract. QPR's unbeaten run was finally ended in their next match, at home, courtesy of Ipswich Town. Despite QPR taking an early lead through a Samuel Di Carmine goal, Ipswich came back to win 3–1. The match was played in front of the Sky Sports cameras and with England national team manager Fabio Capello in attendance. Four days later, Rangers travelled to Cardiff City and earned a 0–0 draw. In a busy fixture period against both play-off rivals and relegation candidates, QPR next faced up to Barnsley at Oakwell. The South Yorkshire club added to Rangers' recent slump in form, running out 2–1 winners.

Rangers' woes continued into March. A second consecutive home defeat to Norwich City (0–1) was followed by a 0–0 draw at home to Sheffield United. On 10 March, QPR suffered their | league defeat of the season, 2–0 away to Doncaster Rovers. The run of poor form left Rangers | in the Championship league table, eight points adrift of the play-off places and ten points above the relegation zone with nine matches left to play.

QPR's defensive streak improved with a draw to now-relegated Southampton, which was further built on in a 1–0 win over Swansea City, courtesy of Mikele Leigertwood's head. The Hoop's form continued with a 2–1 win over Bristol City. QPR initially went one up with a bending free kick from Jordi López, until a powerful strike from Michael McIndoe put the visitors level. Four minutes later, Adel Taarabt scored the winner from close range.

QPR salvaged a goalless draw against local rivals Crystal Palace, though they could have been 2–0 down with close shots from Craig Beattie and Paul Ifill. Equally, Heidar Helguson scuppered a near open goal. However, the experience of Radek Cerny held QPR on in the final stages.

Players

First-team squad
Updated 17 February 2009.

Out on loan

Transfers

In

Out

Results

Football League Championship

FA Cup

League Cup

Competitions

League Championship results summary

League Championship results by matchday

League table

Statistics

Goalscorers

Clean sheets

References

Notes

2008–09
Queens Park Rangers